Bob Benson is an American football coach. He currently serves as the defensive coordinator at the University of Pennsylvania, a position he has held since 2015. Benson was the head football coach at Georgetown University in Washington, D.C. from 1993 to 2005, compiling a record of 72–64.

Head coaching record

References

External links
 Penn profile

Year of birth missing (living people)
Living people
American football wide receivers
Albany Great Danes football coaches
Colorado Mines Orediggers football coaches
Georgetown Hoyas football coaches
Johns Hopkins Blue Jays football coaches
Marietta Pioneers football players
Penn Quakers football coaches
Towson Tigers football coaches
WPI Engineers football coaches
University at Albany, SUNY alumni
University of Vermont alumni